Henry Nemo (June 8, 1909 – November 26, 1999) was an American musician, songwriter, and actor in Hollywood films who had a reputation as a hipster.

Band leading
In 1941, Nemo formed his own 19-piece band. The group featured four Chinese women as singers. Playing on his nickname, "The Neme," the band's slogan was "Hit the Beam with the Neme."

Musical compositions
Nemo's first hit composition was "I Let a Song Go Out of My Heart." He also composed the song standards "Don't Take Your Love From Me" and "'Tis Autumn", both published in 1941. He also composed the incidental music and lyrics for the 1959 Broadway production of Saul Levitt's play The Andersonville Trial directed by José Ferrer and starring George C. Scott.

Nemo worked with Frank Sinatra, Duke Ellington, Mildred Bailey, Tommy Dorsey. Artie Shaw recorded his song "Don't Take Your Love from Me" in 1941 with a band of mostly African-American musicians accompanying African-American vocalist Lena Horne. During his seven-decade career, Nemo lived in Los Angeles and New York City.

Acting
In 1947, Henry Nemo appeared in “Song of the Thin Man”, a murder mystery-comedy directed by Edward Buzzell, and it is the sixth and final film in MGM's Thin Man series. It stared William Powell and Myrna Loy as Nick and Nora Charles, based on characters created by Dashiell Hammett.  Henry Nemo played the character called The Neem.  In 1989, Nemo appeared in The Plot Against Harry, a film made in 1969 by independent filmmakers Michael Roemer and Robert M. Young.

Legacy
Nemo is credited as having been the inspiration for the Starkist tuna advertising mascot, Charlie the Tuna.

Jazz memorabilia collection
Nemo's rare collection of jazz memorabilia documents 1930s music and his days at the Cotton Club, where he wrote the lyrics with Irving Mills and John Redmond for "I Let a Song Go Out of My Heart" (1938), with music by Duke Ellington. In Nemo's historical collection are photographs which he took at the Cotton Club, plus Cotton Club memorabilia and a 1939 telegram from Ellington to Nemo written in jive talk.

References

External links
Information about some of Nemo's recordings at Discography of American Historical Recordings

1909 births
1999 deaths
American male songwriters
20th-century American composers
20th-century American male musicians
Male jazz musicians